A Battle of One Voice: 300 is a South Korean television program that aired on tvN. It is hosted by Kang Ho-dong.

Season 1 aired on Fridays at 19:40 (KST), from August 31, 2018 to September 28, 2018.

Season 2, titled 300 X2, aired from May 3, 2019 to June 21, 2019 on Fridays at 19:40 (KST). For the season, Boom and Shindong (Super Junior) has joined the show's cast as "Singalong Fairies".

Program
Season 1: 8 groups of singers each attempt to gather 300 fans to form teams and pit themselves against one another in a battle of chorus performance stages without any form of rehearsals. The final winner of this series wins ₩100,000,000. After each episode, the audio tracks of the performances will be released as digital singles, under "tvN 300 X NC Fever Music".

Season 2: Unlike Season 1, there will be no battles. Instead, one act and 300 of the fans of the act selected for the show will appear each episode and have a singalong session together. The program will showcase the progress of the session, starting from 10 hours before the session starts. The program will also interview the celebrities and some of the fans who have been chosen for the session and their stories that they want to share for the act to hear.

Battle format (for Season 1 only)

Qualifiers
The studio is specially made to fit a total of 600 fans on two sides of the stage, each side having 300 fans.
Sitting between the two sides are 5 celebrity judges and a passionate judge squad of 100 people, who will then assess the performances and give a score. The 5 celebrity judges each hold 20 points, choosing the side that they each prefer. Each of the 100 people from the passionate judge squad has to choose one of the 2 performances, with each person holding 2 points.
There is an attendance rule that if there is no full attendance of 300, points will be taken off from the total score. (e.g. if there are only 250 fans gathered in the team, the team will have 50 points deducted after the choices of the 5 celebrity judges)
The higher scoring singer for each battle advances to the final.

Final
The studio is specially made to fit a total of 1,200 fans on 4 sides of the stage, each side having 300 fans.
Sitting in between are 5 celebrity judges who each hold 60 points, adding up to a total of 300 points. They will assess each performance and give a score.
There is an attendance rule that if there is no full attendance of 300, points will be taken off from the total score. (e.g. if there are only 250 fans gathered in the team, the team will have 50 points deducted after the choices of the 5 celebrity judges)
The highest scoring singer wins the series.

Session Run-through (for Season 2 only)
 Fans who are interested to join in as part of the 300 fans will have to register through the show's official website, and only the picked 300 fans will attend the recording of the episode.
 About 10 hours before the meeting between the act and the fans, the former will gather in the 300 Room together with the Singalong Fairies. They will have some time to interact with the chosen 300 fans through a secret chat room created, plus giving some pointers to what are to be done for the chorus performance later.
 At the start of the session, the act and the fans are separated by a large black curtain, and as the act performs their opening song, the fans are not to make any noise in order to create some surprise elements for the act. In the middle of this song, the large curtain will fall and both sides are able to see each other. The act will then continue the performance together with the cheering of the fans.
 There is a big change to the attendance rule for this season. Depending on the number of fans that have attended and 1 fan represents ₩100,000, the show will donate the amount of money corresponding to the number of fans that have attended to Musistance (e.g. if there are only 250 fans gathered in the team, the show will donate ₩2,500,000). If all 300 fans are gathered in the studio, the show will donate double the amount of ₩3,000,000 (₩6,000,000) under the name of the act and 300 Singalong Group (e.g. Twice X 300 Singalong Group).

Cast

Host
Kang Ho-dong (Season 1-2)
Boom (Season 2, as "Singalong Fairy")
Shindong (Super Junior) (Season 2, as "Singalong Fairy"; absent for episodes 3, 7)

Celebrity Judges (for Season 1 only)
 Heo Cham (Television host)
 Kim Hyeong-seok (Composer, producer) (Absent for episode 5)
 Kim Eana (Lyricist)
 Lia Kim (Dancer, choreographer)
 Moon Gabi (Model)
 Yoon Sang (Music producer, singer) (For only episode 5)

Contestants (for Season 1 only)
 
 Yoon Min-soo (Vibe)
 Wheesung
  (Yoo Se-yoon + )
 Loco & Gray
 Lovelyz
 iKON
 Weki Meki

Episodes

Season 1

Season 2

Ratings

Season 1

Season 2

 Note that the show airs on a cable channel (pay TV), which plays part in its slower uptake and relatively small audience share when compared to programs broadcast (FTA) on public networks such as KBS, SBS, MBC or EBS.
 NR rating means "not reported".

References

Notes

External links

South Korean reality television series
2018 South Korean television series debuts
TVN (South Korean TV channel) original programming
Korean-language television shows